P. C. Adichan (November 1907 – August 7, 1976) was an Indian politician and a leader of the Communist Party of India (CPI). He was a member of the 4th Lok Sabha, representing the Adoor constituency. Also he was member 2nd KLA representing Kunnathur constituency.

Positions Held
Member, Sree Moolam Assembly (1937–47), 
Member, Travancore Legislative Assembly (1948–49), 
Member, Travancore Cochin Legislative Assembly (1949–51), 
2nd KLA [Kunnathoor],
Member, Lok Sabha [Adoor (1967–71)],
General Secretary and President, All Travancore Kuravar Mahasabha.

References

Communist Party of India politicians from Kerala
India MPs 1967–1970
Kerala MLAs 1957–1959
Travancore–Cochin MLAs 1949–1952
1907 births
Date of death missing